Sandra Voetelink (born 7 August 1970) is a retired speed skater from the Netherlands who was active between 1988 and 1994. In 1992, she won a national title in the 1500 m and finished second in the 500 m and 1000 m. She competed in these three events at the 1992 Winter Olympics with the best achievement of 16th place in the 1000 m.

She married Leo Visser, also an Olympic speed skater.

Sandra was also briefly known in the UK as Kisha (The Starburst) in ITV's action/entertainment television show Ice Warriors (game show) in 1998. The series only lasted for one season but pitted various ice teams across the UK against Kisha and the rest of the Ice Warriors.

Personal bests: 
500 m – 41.00 (1992)
 1000 – 1:22.85 (1992)
 1500 – 2:07.04 (1991)
 3000 – 4:29.23 (1990)
 5000 – 7:54.42 (1992)

References

1970 births
Living people
Dutch female speed skaters
Olympic speed skaters of the Netherlands
Speed skaters at the 1992 Winter Olympics
People from Heerhugowaard
Sportspeople from North Holland
21st-century Dutch women
20th-century Dutch women